The Color of Milk (aka The Colour of Milk, Neither Naked nor Dressed, or Selma and Andy), original title Ikke naken, is a 2004 Norwegian family film by Torun Lian with Julia Krohn (Selma), Ane Dahl Torp (Nora), Gustaf Skarsgård (Främlingen).

External links

2004 films
Norwegian children's films
2000s Norwegian-language films